Eero Yrjö Pehkonen  (May 28, 1882 – February 27, 1949) was a Finnish politician, born in Liminka. He was a member of the Senate of Finland. Pehkonen was minister of agriculture of Finland from 1920 until 1921
and governor of the province of Oulu 1925–1948. He died in Oulu.

1882 births
1949 deaths
People from Liminka
People from Oulu Province (Grand Duchy of Finland)
Centre Party (Finland) politicians
Finnish senators
Ministers of Agriculture of Finland
Members of the Parliament of Finland (1913–16)
Members of the Parliament of Finland (1916–17)
Members of the Parliament of Finland (1917–19)
People of the Finnish Civil War (White side)